Sir Walter Edwin Bate  (12 March 1901 – 12 September 1999) was a New Zealand politician. He served as mayor of Hastings from 1953 to 1959.

Early life and family
Born in Greenmeadows on 12 March 1901, Bate was the son of Peter Bate and Florence Eleanor Bate (née Broadley). He was educated at Napier Boys' High School, and went on to study law at Victoria University College, graduating LLM with first-class honours in 1923.

In 1925, Bate married Annie Louise Jordan, and the couple went on to have three children.

Legal career
Bate worked as a barrister, solicitor and notary public, first in Taumarunui from 1923 to 1926, and then in Hastings until retiring in 1980.

Local government
From 1941 to 1974, Bate served as chairman of the Hawke's Bay Hospital Board, and between 1954 and 1975 he was president of the Hospital Boards Association of New Zealand. He was elected mayor of Hastings in 1953, and remained in that role until 1959.

Other activities
Bate was the first president of the Hawke's Bay Trustee Savings Bank. A Freemason, Bate served as grand master of the Grand Lodge of New Zealand from 1972 to 1974.

Death
Bate died on 12 September 1999, and was buried in Havelock North Cemetery. He had been predeceased by his wife, Louise, in 1988.

Honours and awards
In 1953, Bate was awarded the Queen Elizabeth II Coronation Medal. In the 1955 Queen's Birthday Honours, he was appointed an Officer of the Order of the British Empire, for services to local government. In 1960, he was made an Officer of the Order of St John. Bate was appointed a Knight Bachelor, for services to local government and the community, in the 1969 New Year Honours.

References 

1901 births
1999 deaths
People from Napier, New Zealand
People educated at Napier Boys' High School
Victoria University of Wellington alumni
20th-century New Zealand lawyers
Mayors of Hastings, New Zealand
New Zealand Officers of the Order of the British Empire
Officers of the Order of St John
New Zealand Knights Bachelor
New Zealand Freemasons
Burials at Havelock North Cemetery
Members of district health boards in New Zealand